United Stations Radio Networks (USRN) is a radio network that provides a variety of radio programs and programming services for radio stations throughout the United States and elsewhere. It is based in New York City.

History
The company was founded in February 1994 by pop icon Dick Clark and radio veterans Nick Verbitsky and Ed Salamon. Verbitsky continues to serve as the company's CEO, while Andy Denemark serves as the Vice President of Programming and plays a large role in company contributions.

The similarly named "United Stations Radio Network" (singular), also founded by Clark, Verbitsky, and Salamon in 1980, bought the RKO Radio Networks in 1985 and eventually merged with CBS Radio and the original incarnation of Westwood One.

Programming
USRN's entertainment program offerings include Rewind with Gary Bryan, America's Greatest Hits with Scott Shannon, Nights With Alice Cooper, The House of Hair, various programs hosted by Tom Kent, Lex and Terry, Absolutely 80s with Nina Blackwood, Open House Party, Dick Bartley's Classic Hits, Rock & Roll's Greatest Hits also hosted by Bartley, the Lou Brutus shows hardDrive and hardDriveXL, The Sandy Show, Rick Jackson's Country Classics, and reruns of Dick Clark's Rock, Roll & Remember and the daily Music Calendar. The company also co-manages, along with iHeartMedia, the Your Smooth Jazz network provided by Broadcast Architecture.

United Stations distributes Bloomberg Radio's 24-hour and short-form business news programming. Weather information is sourced from AccuWeather, whose forecasts USRN has distributed since 2009 (taking over the distribution from the original Westwood One). Previously, Al Roker and John Wetherbee ran USRN's weather division.

Other services include a morning prep service known as "Pulse of Radio", as well as comedy programming. United Stations distributes college football broadcasts from Touchdown Radio Productions.

References

External links

American radio networks
National Football League on the radio
1994 establishments in the United States
Mass media companies based in New York City